The 2003–04 Pittsburgh Panthers men's basketball team represented the University of Pittsburgh in the 2003–04 NCAA Division I men's basketball season. Led by first year head coach Jamie Dixon, the Panthers finished with a record of 31–5 and made it to the Sweet 16 of the 2004 NCAA Division I men's basketball tournament where they lost to Oklahoma State.

Roster

Bibliography
Pitt 2017–18 Basketball Media Guide, 2017, pages 77, 99–100.

References

Pittsburgh Panthers men's basketball seasons
Pittsburgh
Pittsburgh
Pittsburgh Pan
Pittsburgh Pan